The West Papuan languages are a proposed language family of about two dozen non-Austronesian languages of the Bird's Head Peninsula (Vogelkop or Doberai Peninsula) of far western New Guinea, the island of Halmahera and its vicinity, spoken by about 220,000 people in all. It is not established if they constitute a proper linguistic family or an areal network of genetically unrelated families.

The best known "West Papuan" language is Ternate (50,000 native speakers) of the island of the same name, which is a regional lingua franca and which, along with neighboring Tidore, were the languages of the rival medieval Ternate and Tidore sultanates, famous for their role in the spice trade.

Languages
West Papuan
North Halmahera (Halmahera – West Makian)
Core North Halmahera
West Makian
Amberbaken (Mpur)
Yawa (Yapen)
West–Central Bird's Head
West Bird's Head
Abun
Maybrat (Central Bird's Head)
East Bird's Head
Burmeso
Hatam–Mansim (Hatam – Moi Brai)
Mantion–Meax (Southeast Bird's Head)

History
The German linguist Wilhelm Schmidt first linked the West Bird's Head and North Halmahera languages in 1900. In 1957 H.K.J. Cowan linked them to the non-Austronesian languages of Timor as well. Stephen Wurm believed that although traces of West Papuan languages were to be found in the languages of Timor, as well as those of Aru and Great Andaman, this was due to a substratum and that these languages should be classified as Trans–New Guinea, Austronesian, and Andamanese, respectively. Indeed, most of the languages of East Nusa Tenggara and Maluku appear to have some non-Austronesian influence.

In 2005, Malcolm Ross made a tentative proposal, based on the forms of their pronouns, that the West Papuan languages form one of three branches of an extended West Papuan family that also includes the Yawa languages, and a newly proposed East Bird's Head – Sentani family as a third branch. 

Søren Wichmann (2013) considers West Bird's Head, Abun, and Maybrat to form a unified family, but does not accept West Papuan as a coherent language family.

Timothy Usher, also somewhat tentatively, accepts Yawa and East Bird's Head, but not Sentani, as part of West Papuan itself, so the family can remain under that name.

Holton and Klamer (2018) do not unequivocally accept the unity of West Papuan, but note that certain proposals linking "West Papuan" groups together may eventually turn out to be fruitful. Ger Reesink suggests that the West Papuan family should be considered an areal network of unrelated linguistic families, noting the lack of adequate evidence for genetic relatedness.

Pronouns
The pronouns Ross reconstructs for proto-West Papuan are,

{| class=wikitable
|-
| rowspan=2| I || rowspan=2| *da, *di- || exclusive we || *mam, *mi-
|-
| inclusive we || *po-
|-
| thou || *ni, *na, *a- || you || *nan, *ni-
|-
| she || *mV || they || *yo, *ana, *yo-
|}

These are shared by the "core" West Papuan families. Hattam reflects only "I" and "thou", and Amberbaken only "thou", "you", and "she".

Ross's Extended West Papuan languages have forms in *d for "I" and *m for "we". (Most Yawa forms of "we" have m, such as imama, but they are too diverse for an easy reconstruction.) These are found in all branches of the family except for the Amberbaken isolate.

Ross's West Papuan proper is distinguished from Yawa and EBH-Sentani in having forms like na or ni for the second-person singular ("thou") pronoun.

{| class=wikitable
|-
! family !! I !! thou !! we 
|-
| West Papuan || *da, *di- || *na, *ni, *a- || *mam, *mi 
|-
| EBH-Sentani || *da, *di || *ba~wa, *bi || *meme, *me  
|-
| Yava || *rei || *wein || (imama etc.)
|}

Word order
Word order is SVO in the West Bird's Head family and in western North Halmahera languages (Ternate, Tidore, West Makian, and Sahu; due to Austronesian influence). SVO word order is also present in the isolates Abun, Mpur, and Maibrat.

The South Bird's Head family generally has SOV word order, although SVO word order is also permitted in transitive clauses. The Timor-Alor-Pantar languages also have verb-final word order.

Phonology
All Papuan languages of East Nusantara have five or more vowels.

Abun and Mpur are fully tonal languages, with Mpur having 4 lexical tones, and Abun having 3 lexical tones. Meyah and Sougb are pitch-accent languages. All other languages of the Bird's Head Peninsula are non-tonal.

Of all the Papuan languages spoken in the Bird's Head Peninsula, Abun has the largest consonant inventory with 20 consonants, while neighboring Maybrat has the smallest with 11 consonants. Large consonant inventories similar to that of Abun are also found in the North Halmahera languages, such as Tobelo, Tidore, and Sahu.

Lexical comparison

Basic vocabulary of two West Bird's Head languages (WBH) (Moi and Tehit) and three language isolates (Mpur, Abun, Maibrat), quoted by Holton & Klamer (2018) from Miedema & Reesink (2004: 34) and (Reesink 2005: 202); these show diverse non-cognate forms among Papuan languages of the Bird's Head Peninsula:

{| 
|+ West Bird's Head family and Bird's Head isolates: basic vocabulary
! gloss !! Moi (WBH) !! Tehit (WBH) !! Mpur !! Abun !! Maibrat
|-
| arm/hand || nin || naa || wom || cim || atem
|-
| leg/foot || eelik || deit || pet || wis || ao
|-
| house || keik || mbol || jan || nu || amah
|-
| good || bok || hnjo || mafun || ndo || mof
|-
| dog || oofun || mqaan || per || ndar || mtah
|-
| pig || baik || qorik || dwaw || nok || fane
|-
| chicken || kelem tole || kokok || kokor || dam kukur || kok
|-
| louse || -jam || hain || im || im || sruom
|-
| water/river || kla || kla || war ||  || aja
|-
| banana || o || ogo || fa || weu || apit
|}

Lexical lookalikes between North Halmahera languages (NH) (Galela and Pagu) and West Bird's Head languages (WBH) (Moi and Tehit) from Voorhoeve (1988: 194), as quoted by Holton & Klamer (2018):

{| 
|+ Lexical comparisons between North Halmahera and West Bird's Head families
! gloss !! Galela (NH) !! Pagu (NH) !! Moi (WBH) !! Tehit (WBH)
|-
| ‘head’ || sahe || saek || sawa || safakos
|-
| ‘fruit’, ‘eye’ || sopo || sowok || suwo || sfuon
|-
| ‘egg’ || gosi || – || – || esyen
|-
| ‘man’ || ya-nau || naul || ne || nau
|-
| ‘meat’ || lake || lakem || kem || qan
|-
| ‘tree’ || gota || – || – || kot
|-
| ‘water’ || ake || akel || kala || kla
|-
| ‘drink’ || oke || okel || ook || ooqo
|-
| ‘stab’ || saka || sakal || saa || sqaa
|}

The lexical data below is from the Trans-New Guinea database and Usher (2020), unless noted otherwise.

See also
Papuan languages
West Trans–New Guinea languages
Districts of West Papua for a list of districts and villages with respective languages
List of ethnic groups of West Papua

References

External links
West Papuan sound comparisons

 
Proposed language families
Languages of western New Guinea
Papuan languages